White Rock is a city in British Columbia, Canada, and a member municipality of the Metro Vancouver Regional District. It borders Semiahmoo Bay to the south and is surrounded on three sides by Surrey. To the southeast across a footbridge lies the Semiahmoo First Nation, which is within the borders of Surrey. Semiahmoo Bay and the Southern Gulf Islands in the Strait of Georgia are also to the south.

White Rock is named for a large white boulder on its beach near the promenade, a glacial erratic that migrated south during the last glaciation. The 486-ton granite boulder was kept white by shellfish-eating seabirds whose guano covered the rock so much that 19th-century sailors used it as a beacon. It is now kept white through monthly applications of white paint by the city parks department and has been a graffiti target. The White Rock Pier is located nearby.

History

Early history

The Straits Salish people dominated the region from Boundary Bay in the north to Birch Bay in the south (in the U.S.). Semiahmoo First Nation permanent encampments were known to exist between 1791, the first European contact, and the 1850s, the beginnings of European settlement. These were located along the waterfront at the eastern and western limits of the present City of White Rock. The Semiahmoo people also constructed forts as lookouts for raiders from the northern first nations; one is located in the Ocean Park area.

The Oregon boundary dispute culminated in the Oregon Treaty of 1846, which settled the outstanding border issues between Great Britain and the United States. Previously, these issues had been put on hold through a shared occupancy agreement of the Oregon territory by the two nations in the Treaty of 1818. In turn, the International Boundary Survey Commission began in 1857 to set the boundary between the United States and British North America, roughly along the 49th parallel, which runs through Semiahmoo Bay and Boundary Bay to Point Roberts, Washington.

The Semiahmoo Trail still exists in White Rock and South Surrey, running from the site of the Boundary Commission Camp at the estuary of the Campbell River, overland to Mud Bay north of Crescent Beach. An 1865 survey map calls this route the 'Telegraph Trail'. During the real-estate boom of the 1980s and 90s, the City of Surrey preserved much of the trail, extending it from 20 Avenue to the Nicomekl River. On 148 Street, a specially constructed "Semiahmoo Trail" pedestrian overpass keeps the trail intact.

Modern history

The modern history of White Rock is directly tied to the railway linking British Columbia to Washington state, which runs along the shore of Semiahmoo Bay to the border. The rail is currently owned by BNSF Railway and runs alongside the promenade at the beach. This was originally the Great Northern line, and it opened up White Rock and Crescent Beach to tourists from Vancouver and New Westminster in the early 1900s. The border crossing closest to White Rock (at Douglas, B.C., and Blaine, Washington) was officially opened in 1908, and the Peace Arch at the border crossing was constructed in the 1920s.

In 1913, the present railway station was opened, and the Fox and Hunter Shingle mill began operation. The Campbell River Mill also opened to the east, bringing a minor boom in the local economy. The now-famous pier was opened in 1914 to provide a deep-water mooring facility.

In the 1950s, White Rock residents began to feel isolated from the then–District of Surrey, where development was being concentrated elsewhere, particularly in North Surrey and Cloverdale. On April 15, 1957, a special warrant from the Government of British Columbia created the City of White Rock within its present boundary.

In the 1950s, Peace Arch Hospital opened and continues as a major employer in the city and health facility for the region.

Development was concentrated near the waterfront until the 1960s and 1970s. Many small cliffside dwellings were affordable to those unable to pay the cost of living closer to Vancouver. White Rock gained a reputation for being a retirement centre, as it features the lowest rainfall in the Metro Vancouver region, while benefitting from the influence of the ocean, keeping both summers highs and winter lows bearable.

The development of Highway 99 and the opening of the Deas Island Tunnel (now the George Massey Tunnel) created a second boom for the White Rock area, providing a more convenient commuter route to Vancouver. No longer dependent upon the railway, development crept up the hillside. In the 1980s, the City of Surrey designated South Surrey as a town centre comparable to Guildford, Cloverdale, and Newton. The Semiahmoo Mall opened in Surrey on the north side of 16 Avenue (the south side of which is North Bluff Road within White Rock).

In 1979, chartered accountant Tom Kirstein and architect Chip Barrett organized an annual sandcastle competition, which became internationally famous. The event took advantage of the long, sandy beach exposed at low tide, giving enough time for entrants to construct elaborate displays. Prizes of up to $10,000 were awarded, and crowds of 150,000 were estimated at the competition's height. In 1987, the contest was ended because of security costs and concerns. In 2008, a group of local high school students (Sara Woodward, Jorden Abernethy, Daniel Fowler, Michael Vanderpolder, and Tasha Svenson) and members of the community (Spenser Bolen, Michael Nolan, Trixie Nolan, and Lisa Nolan) launched a Sandcastle Competition revival. This competition drew 40,000 guests and over 70 teams.

The 1970s saw the White Rock/South Surrey area develop into a suburban bedroom community of the Lower Mainland. A real-estate boom in the area drew many young families to homes marketed to young professionals, a process that intensified in the mid-1990s. Today, many parts of the community resemble the type of suburban development seen across North America. Some cliffside cottages have given way to large homes, and multimillion-dollar properties have appeared in the area.

In the late 1980s, the development of the Peninsula Village Mall on 24 Avenue in Surrey pushed development farther north and hurt some small businesses in White Rock. Recent commercial and residential development in Surrey's Grandview Heights neighbourhood, east of Highway 99 at 24 Avenue, continues the trend of auto-oriented, suburban development in the surrounding area. While the City of White Rock lies ten blocks to the southwest of this 6.5-km big-box project, the community's centre of gravity may shift again as development continues.

Uptown White Rock has been the site of significant new developments in recent years, with medium-rise condos becoming more prominent. The City of White Rock's fire department was located half a block north of its city limits until the early 1990s, when a new firehall was built across from City Hall. In 2007, the White Rock Little League team made it to the Little League World Series.

On December 20, 2018, during a severe windstorm, the White Rock Pier was severed when sailboats broke free from the attached marina and crashed into the pier destroying a 30-metre section. At least 15 boats sank and several were wedged underneath the pier's pilings. Replacement plans call for a new pier that could be built by the end of August 2019, with an early cost estimate that is projected to be over $5 million. As of May 2, 2019, the cost estimate for a rebuild to modern seismic standards is $16.2 million. On August 28, 2019, the pier re-opened to the public although certain elements such as lighting have yet to be completed. Darryl Walker has been mayor since 2018.

Geography
The boundaries between White Rock and Surrey are Bergstrom Road (136 Street) to the west, North Bluff Road (16th Avenue) to the north, Stayte Road (160 Street) to the east, and 8th Avenue to the south. The area south of 8 Avenue from Stayte Road westward to where 8 Avenue meets the water is the Semiahmoo Indian Reserve and lies within the bounds of the City of Surrey (though it is governed separately). The Surrey neighbourhoods of Ocean Park and Crescent Beach lie immediately to the northwest.

Climate
White Rock has a moderate climate, with average daily high temperatures of 23 degrees Celsius in summer and 6 degrees Celsius in winter.

White Rock's climate is moderate year-round. Because the city is set away from the Coast Mountains, it sees less fog, fewer rainy days and shorter snowfalls. Meteorological statistics show that White Rock does, in fact, receive 20 percent more sunshine than does Vancouver. Annual rainfall averages .

Demographics

Ethnicity

Religion 
According to the 2021 census, religious groups in White Rock included:
Irreligion (9,855 persons or 47.6%)
Christianity (8,875 persons or 42.8%)
Sikhism (905 persons or 4.4%)
Hinduism (245 persons or 1.2%)
Islam (205 persons or 1.0%)
Buddhism (160 persons or 0.8%)
Judaism (115 persons or 0.6%)
Other (360 persons or 1.7%)

Annual events
Every year in July, the city hosts the Tour de White Rock, a bicycle road race that attracts over 150 local and international riders. In 2005, the event was part of the Canadian Cycling Association's national Road Race Series.

Every year during the first weekend of August, the Spirit of the Sea Festival is held on White Rock beach. It usually includes a parade, fireworks, music stages, a sandcastle competition, and various other beach-related activities. The festival began in 1949.

Infrastructure

Transportation

Transportation in White Rock largely revolves around the automobile. Highway 99 is a freeway that links the White Rock area with Vancouver to the north and U.S. Interstate 5, via the Peace Arch border crossing, to the south. King George Highway (Highway 99A) links the Peace Arch border with Surrey Central station and New Westminster via the soon-to-be-replaced Pattullo Bridge. Johnston Road (152 Street) links White Rock to Guildford and the Trans-Canada Highway (Highway 1).

Most of White Rock's bus routes run through the White Rock Centre transit exchange. From there, the 351 and 354 buses, which previously ran to downtown Vancouver, now terminate at Bridgeport station in Richmond; Vancouver-bound passengers have to transfer onto the Canada Line rapid transit line. Only one route serving the area, the 352 Ocean Park/Bridgeport Station express bus, does not run through White Rock Centre, instead terminating near the South Surrey Athletic Park. The 321, 345, and 394 buses provide service to North Surrey, notably to Surrey Central and King George Skytrain stations, and the 375 service runs through White Rock Centre from just north of the Peace Arch border crossing to Guildford Town Centre. The 531 bus runs from White Rock Centre to Willowbrook Mall in Langley. Community Shuttle routes, the 360, 361, 362, and 363, service local communities within White Rock and South Surrey.

BNSF Railway has a single-track main line through White Rock that runs the length of the White Rock beach promenade. The city itself has no train service; however, this rail line is a major corridor for goods transported between the ports of Vancouver and the continental U.S., as well as for the Amtrak Cascades passenger service between Seattle and Vancouver via Bellingham, Washington. The Canadian National Railway and the Canadian Pacific Railway (CPR) also have trackage rights along the line. Goods transported on the corridor include Canadian softwood lumber, coal, paper products, and general merchandise. The CPR runs regular potash trains along the line to the Canpotex export terminal in Oregon.

Notable people 
Andy Anderson, skateboarder
Jeff Bandura, hockey player
Hilary Caldwell, Olympic swimmer
Paul Campbell, actor from Battlestar Galactica
Desirée Dawson, singer and winner of the 2016 Searchlight talent contest
Jason Garrison, journeyman National Hockey League defenseman
Colton Gillies, former left winger for the Columbus Blue Jackets
Christine Girard, Olympic weightlifter
Gigi Saul Guerrero, filmmaker and actress 
Andrew Hammond, goaltender for the Colorado Avalanche
Ellie Harvie, actress
Gordon Hogg, former BC Liberal MLA for Surrey-White Rock (1997–2017) and Liberal Party of Canada MP for South Surrey-White Rock (2017–2019).
George Frederick Ives, supercentenarian and last surviving Boer War veteran.
Jim Hughson, sportscaster
Moose Johnson, left-winger and defenseman for the Montreal Wanderers and member of the Hockey Hall of Fame 
Riall Johnson, National Football League player
Teyo Johnson, National Football League player
Ra McGuire, singer and founder of the Canadian rock group Trooper
Arnold Mikelson, wood sculptor
Gabrielle Miller, actress
Jim Mullin, President, Football Canada, broadcaster
Gordon Rice, artist
Hannah Simone, actress on the television series New Girl
Cobie Smulders, actress known for playing Robin Scherbatsky in the CBS sitcom How I Met Your Mother
Jewel Staite, actress on the television series Firefly
Colten Teubert, hockey player
Reece Thompson, actor
Daniel Wesley, rock/reggae musician

White Rock in television and film

Scenes from the boxing film Knockout were filmed in White Rock. Portions of the 1965 film The Railrodder starring Buster Keaton were filmed in White Rock. Much of the 1982 movie Big Meat Eater was filmed near and around the White Rock waterfront. The USA Network's detective comedy Psych was also filmed in White Rock, though the series is set in Santa Barbara, California. There is also a brief scene in Leaving Normal filmed at the White Rock waterfront. Scenes from The X-Files were also filmed here, as were scenes from the Steven Seagal movie Driven to Kill. An episode of the FX dramedy series Better Things from its second season titled "White Rock", that originally aired on November 9, 2017, had scenes that was filmed in White Rock. The Hallmark movie Like Cats & Dogs had many city scenes filmed here, as well as scenes on the public pier. K-pop girl group Twice features local White Rock gelato shop Ocean Rock Cafe on Marine Drive as well as the historic pier and railway in their 2018 music video Likey.

Notes

References

External links

 
Beaches of British Columbia
Cities in British Columbia
Populated places in Greater Vancouver